Pringsang Sangma (born 14 February 1995) is an Indian cricketer. He made his first-class debut on 27 January 2020, for Meghalaya in the 2019–20 Ranji Trophy.

References

External links
 

1995 births
Living people
Indian cricketers
Meghalaya cricketers
Place of birth missing (living people)